The 1954 Argentine Primera División was the 63rd season of top-flight football in Argentina. The season began on April 4 and ended on November 14.

Tigre returned to Primera while Banfield was relegated. Boca Juniors won its 13th league title

League standings

References

Argentine Primera División seasons
Argentine Primera Division
Primera Division